Abdullino (Abdulla) is a rural locality (a village) in Starobabichevsky Selsoviet of Karmaskalinsky District, Bashkortostan, Russia. The population was 110 as of 2010. There is 1 street.

Geography 
Abdullino is located 23 km south of Karmaskaly (the district's administrative centre) by road. Starobabichevo is the nearest rural locality.

Ethnicity 
The village is inhabited by Bashkirs and others.

References 

Rural localities in Karmaskalinsky District